"Funny How Time Flies (When You're Having Fun)" is a song by American singer Janet Jackson from her third studio album, Control (1986). It was released on November 25, 1987, by A&M Records as the album's seventh and final single.  The song was written and produced by Jackson and collaborators Jimmy Jam and Terry Lewis. While "Funny How Time Flies (When You're Having Fun)" was officially released in the United Kingdom and Australia, it was released solely for airplay in the United States in 1987. The single reached number 59 on the UK Singles Chart and number 24 on the Irish Singles Chart. In the US, though it was ineligible to chart, became a quiet storm staple on adult R&B and soul radio stations. No music video was filmed for the single.

Jazz musician Stanley Clarke covered the song for his 1988 album If This Bass Could Only Talk. The song was also sampled on The Lost Boyz's "Renee" and on Camp Lo's "Coolie High", both from 1996. In 2014, it was sampled on Tinashe's "How Many Times" from her debut album Aquarius. Two years later, it was sampled on SWV's "MCE (Man Crush Everyday)".

Live performances
Jackson included the song as an instrumental interlude on her Rhythm Nation World Tour 1990. She performed the full song on her 2008 Rock Witchu Tour. Jackson also included the song in her performances at the 2010, 2018, & 2022 Essence Music Festival, held in New Orleans, Louisiana. The song was used as an interlude for the video introduction on the Unbreakable World Tour (2015–2016), and was later included on the second leg of the 2018 State of the World Tour. Jackson included the song at her 2019 Las Vegas residency Janet Jackson: Metamorphosis.

Track listings
UK and Australian 7-inch single
A. "Funny How Time Flies (When You're Having Fun)" – 4:29
B. "When I Think of You" – 3:57

UK 12-inch single
A1. "Funny How Time Flies (When You're Having Fun)" – 4:29
A2. "Nasty" (Cool Summer Mix – Part One) – 7:57
B1. "When I Think of You" (Dance Remix) – 6:25

Charts

References

1980s ballads
1986 songs
1987 singles
Janet Jackson songs
Pop ballads
Contemporary R&B ballads
Songs written by Janet Jackson
Songs written by Jimmy Jam and Terry Lewis
Song recordings produced by Jimmy Jam and Terry Lewis
Soul ballads
Quiet storm songs